Buger is a village in Iran.

Buger may also refer to:

 Búger, a small municipality in the Balearic Islands, Spain
 Buger (Tanzanian ward), an administrative ward in Tanzania